Augustus Frank (July 17, 1826 – April 29, 1895) was an American merchant, railroad executive, banker and politician. He served as a United States representative from the U.S. state of New York during the American Civil War.

Early life

Frank was born in Warsaw, Wyoming County, the son of Augustus and Jane (Patterson) Frank. He attended the common schools and engaged in mercantile pursuits.

Career
In 1856, he was a delegate to the Republican National Convention. He was elected and served three terms as a Republican Congressman from New York, serving from March 4, 1859, to March 3, 1865, in the 36th, 37th, and 38th Congresses. He was not a candidate for renomination in 1864. He was instrumental in the passage of the Thirteenth Amendment which abolished slavery.

After his final term in Congress, Frank became the director of the Wyoming County National Bank in 1865. In 1867 and 1868, he was a member of the New York constitutional convention. From 1870 to 1872, Frank was one of the managers of the Buffalo State Asylum for the Insane in Buffalo, New York. He organized the Bank of Warsaw in 1871 and served as its president until his death in 1895.

Frank was the director and vice president of the Buffalo and New York City Railroad Company in 1887-1893, and was also director of the Rochester Trust and Safe Deposit Company. In 1894, he was a delegate at large to the State constitutional convention. Frank was State commissioner for the preservation of public parks and was a member of the board of directors of the Buffalo, Rochester and Pittsburgh Railroad.

He died in New York City on April 29, 1895, and is interred in Warsaw Cemetery in Warsaw, New York.

Family life
In 1867, Frank married Agnes McNair. The couple had two children, William Augustus and Mary Louise Frank. Their son died in infancy.

Frank was the nephew of two other U.S. Representatives, William Patterson and George Washington Patterson.

See also
United States congressional delegations from New York

References

External links 
 

	
	

1826 births
1895 deaths
People from Warsaw, New York
American bankers
People of New York (state) in the American Civil War
19th-century American railroad executives
Republican Party members of the United States House of Representatives from New York (state)
19th-century American politicians